Semytino is a small village in Pestovsky District of (Novgorod Oblast, Russia). It is located 11 km from Pestovo.

References

Rural localities in Novgorod Oblast